Charles "Bock" Baker (July 17, 1878 – August 17, 1940) was a Major League Baseball pitcher who played for the Cleveland Blues for one game in 1901, and the Philadelphia Athletics for one game in 1901. His debut for the Blues was memorable for the wrong reason – Baker gave up 23 singles in a 10-1 loss to the Chicago White Sox, an American League record that still stands for the most singles surrendered by a pitcher in a game.

References

External links

1878 births
1940 deaths
Cleveland Blues (1901) players
Philadelphia Athletics players
Hamilton Hams players
Hamilton Blackbirds players
Buffalo Bisons (minor league) players
Cleveland Lake Shores players
Jersey City Skeeters players
Albany Senators players
St. Joseph Saints players
Baseball players from New York (state)